Francisco Freire Allemão e Cysneiro (24 June 1797 – 11 November 1874) was a Brazilian botanist who collected in northeast Brazil and along the Rio de Janeiro. His association with the Brazilian National Museum in Rio de Janeiro took place at a time when Brazilian botany was dominated by foreigners.

Among his many duties as physician of the Brazilian court was to fetch the Emperor's bride from Italy.

Some genera and species named by him: 
Astronium urundeuva 
Myracrodruon urundeuva 
Acanthinophyllum strepitans  (Moraceae)
Amburana cearensis  (Fabaceae) (synonym: Torresea cearensis )
Andradea  (Nyctaginaceae)
Andradea floribunda 
Azeredia  (Cochlospermaceae)
Bumella sartarum  (Sapotaceae)
Azeredia pernambucana 
Chrysophyllum arenarium  (Sapotaceae)
Chrysophyllum cearaense  = Chrysophyllum gonocarpum 
Chrysophyllum cysneiri  = Chrysophyllum gonocarpum 
Chrysophyllum obtusifolium  = Chrysophyllum gonocarpum 
Chrysophyllum perfidum 
Chrysophyllum tomentosum 
Cordia oncocalyx  (Boraginaceae)
Dalbergia nigra (Fabaceae)
Echyrospermum balthazarii  (Fabaceae)
Hyeronima  (Euphorbiaceae)
Hyeronima alchorneoides 
Jussiaea fluctuans  (Onagraceae)
Lucuma meruocana  (Sapotaceae)
Lucuma minutiflora 
Lucuma montana 
Luetzelburgia auriculata  (Fabaceae)
Manilkara elata  (synonym: Mimusops elata )
Mezia navalium  (Lauraceae) (synonyms: Mezilaurus navalium ; Silvia navalium )
Mimusops triflora  (Sapotaceae)
Miscolobium nigrum  (Fabaceae)
Moldenhawera speciosa  (Fabaceae)
Myrocarpus 
Ophthalmoblapton macrophyllum  (Euphorbiaceae)
Pinckneya viridiflora  (Rubiaceae) (synonym: Simira viridiflora ; Sickingia viridiflora )
Pterygota brasiliensis  (Sterculiaceae)
Ribeirea  (Santalaceae)
Ribeirea calophylla 
Ribeirea calva 
Ribeirea cupulata 
Ribeirea elliptica 
Tipuana auriculata  (Fabaceae)
Vatairea heteroptera 
Vazea  (Olacaceae)
Zollernia mocitayba  (Caesalpiniaceae)

References 

1797 births
1874 deaths
19th-century Brazilian botanists
National Museum of Brazil